Teen Batti Char Raasta is a 1953 Hindi-language comedy drama film on national integration directed by V. Shantaram. The film was made under the Rajkamal Kalamandir banner and produced by Shantaram. The story and dialogue were by Diwan Sharar while the cinematography was by G. Balkrishna. With music composed by Shivram Krishna, it had lyrics by Pyare Lal Santoshi. The star cast included Karan Dewan, Sandhya, Shashikala, Nirupa Roy, Sheila Ramani, Dewan Sharar and Lalita Kumari.

The film, which portrays national integration, involved a family, whose patriarch Lala Gulabchand (Diwan Sharar), is a Punjabi married to a woman from Uttar Pradesh. He lives near a crossroads with three lights and four streets. The crossroads is used symbolically as a union of the different states and religions in the country, as mentioned in the film.  Their five of six sons then marry girls from five different states in India and the story follows the chaos that ensues. The film had a sub-plot weaved into it in the form of a dark-complexioned girl, Shyama (Sandhya), who is first humiliated by the hero Ramesh (Karan Dewan), and then accepted by him as he falls in love with the "real person".

Plot
Lala Gulabchand, is a Punjabi and his wife is from Uttar Pradesh. They live at the corner of a crossroads with three lights and four roads. He is a firm believer in national unity and has had five of his six sons, each married to a girl from a different state; a Marathi, Sindhi, Bengali, Tamil and a Gujarati. His sixth son Ramesh (Karan Dewan), works in the press and is a writer and an artist. He is a bachelor but falls in love with a woman named Kokila whose singing he hears on the radio. He draws a portrait of Kokila from imagination just listening to her sing. Unbeknownst to him, Kokila, called Shyama, is the dark-complexioned maid who works in their home and is proficient in all the different languages that the wives of the brothers speak and is very efficient at her chores. However, he rejects her as she's dark and Shyama leaves the house despondent. The turmoil the household goes through with the absence of Shyama and a repentant Ramesh finally makes for a happy ending by everyone getting together again.

Cast

Female Cast
 Sandhya as Shyama / Kokila
 Shashikala as Lalita, Marathi wife
 Nirupa Roy as Kanta, the Gujarati wife
 Sheila Ramani as Kamla, the Sindhi wife
 Smriti Biswas as Sadhona, the Bengali wife 
 Meenakshi as Laxmi, the Tamil wife
 Lalita Kumari as Roopa
 Sofy
 Meera

Male Cast
 Karan Dewan as Ramesh
 Dewan Sharar as Lala Gulabchand
 Parshuram
 Keshavrao Date
 Asit Baran
 Moolchand as share broker
 Vikas
 Surendra
 K. Mohan
 Shankardas Gupta
 Kamal
 Ishwar

Crew
 Director: V. Shantaram
 Producer: V. Shantaram
 Banner: Rajkamal Kalamandir
 Audiography: A. K. Parmar
 Art Direction: D. S. Kale
 Editing: Chintamani Borkar
 Music: Shivram Krishna 
 Lyrics: Pyarelal Santoshi
 Background Music: Vasant Desai
 Make-up: Vardam
 Choreographer: Gauri Shankar
 Still Photography: Kirtiwan

Soundtrack
The music director was Shivram Krishna and the lyrics were written by Santoshi. One song in the film was composed by Vasant Desai and he also provided the background music. The singers were Lata Mangeshkar, Asha Bhosle, Zohrabai Ambalewali, Talat Mahmood and S. Balbir. The two songs by Talat, "Ek Do Teen Chaar Paanch" and "Tumse Hai Pyar Mujhe" were picturised on Karan Dewan.

A "multilingual, multicultural song" was shown at different parts in the film. The song had different singers, lyricists, and composers representing the different languages from different states. The song started with the Bengali part "O Re O Poraan Bondhu Re" and its singers were Mangeshkar, Zohrabai, Balbir and others. The music and lyrics for the Bengali part was by Kanu Ghosh; for Tamil, the lyrics and composition was by Natraj; for Sindhi, the composer was Gulshan Sufi with lyrics by Ram Panjwani; for Marathi the music was by Vasant Desai with lyrics by G. D. Madgulkar; for Gujarati, the music and lyrics were by Avinash Vyas; for Punjabi, music was by Shivram Krishna with lyrics by Feroz; the Hindi part had music by Krishna with lyrics by P. L. Santoshi.

Songlist

Trivia
In Mumbai, near the sacred Banganga Tank area on Malabar Hill, past the Birla Balika Vidhya Kendra girls school, is a cross-roads still called "Teen Batti" (Three Lights), which became famous after the release of Shantaram's film Teen Batti Char Raasta.

References

External links

1953 films
1950s Hindi-language films
Films directed by V. Shantaram
Films scored by Avinash Vyas
Indian black-and-white films
1953 comedy-drama films
Indian comedy-drama films